Jwan is a gender neutral given name, which means "pretty" in Kurdish Sorani language.

It may refer to:
Jwan Hajo or Ciwan Haco (born 1957), Kurdish singer
Jwan Hesso (born 1982), Syrian football player
Jwan Yosef (born 1984), Syrian Swedish artist in painting and plastic arts

See also
Joan
Juan
Juwan